Keshit castle is a historical castle located in Kerman County in Kerman Province, The longevity of this fortress dates back to the Seljuk Empire.

References 

Castles in Iran
Seljuk castles